Brinklow is a village and civil parish in the Rugby district of Warwickshire, England. It is about halfway between Rugby and Coventry, and has a population of 1,041 (2001 Census), increasing to 1,101 at the 2011 Census.

Geography 
Brinklow sits astride the former Roman Fosse Way and is most notable for the remains of a large Norman motte-and-bailey castle (Brinklow Castle, known locally as The Tump or the Big Hill), which is one of the largest and best preserved of its type in England. The castle is believed to be built on the site of an ancient burial mound or Roman signal station, although this has not been confirmed. Brinklow's name may have come from Old English Brincehláw = "burial mound on the brink of a hill" or alternatively perhaps "The Hill of Brynca", an Anglo-Saxon personal name. More likely though  the name Brinklow is a combination of the British/Welsh bryn,a hill and the Anglo Saxon hlaw also meaning hill. The name came about when the original Celtic speaking inhabitants were assimilated into Anglo Saxon culture. The meaning of the British word bryn was after some time forgotten causing the Anglo Saxonized inhabitants to add the word hlaw or low to signify a hill. Place names in England which combine both British and Anglo Saxon elements which  have the same meaning are quite common.  Penhill in Buckinghamshire and Mount Caburn, originally called Caer Bryn, in Lewes, East Sussex are both notable examples.

Brinklow contains a 13th-century church, a primary school, and several shops and pubs. Brinklow was established as a market town during the Middle Ages, and was once considerably more important than it is today. 

The Oxford Canal was authorised in 1769 and the section through Brinklow was completed in 1778. The original route of the canal crossed Broad Street (B4455) near the Church Rooms, circled through the playing fields to the west of the village before crossing the Lutterworth Road again at the north end of the village. This brought much trade and prosperity to Brinklow. However, by the late 1820s, the extravagant winding contour route of the Oxford canal had become outdated. It was said that boatmen with their horse-drawn boats could hear the sound of Brinklow church bells ringing for morning and then evening prayer on the same day! 

To maintain its competitive edge much of the northern section of the canal between Braunston and its junction at Hawkesbury with the Coventry Canal was straightened with massive engineering works creating embankments and cuttings. This cut off nearly 14 miles of its length and much of the original course consequently became disused. Some of the loops remain at least in part such at the arm leading north from the boatyard at Stretton Stop. Although much of the original route has been abandoned it can still be traced and parts are still in water such as the stretch running west from the Rugby Road.

The village maintains its links with the canal through the thriving boatyard and boat hire company Rose Narrowboats at Stretton Stop to the north of the village.  The boatyard was started in 1960 at the site of the old lengthmans cottage. The manager was Charles Haslam and he worked for the Maid Line Cruiser Company from Thames Ditton, in London. The house was renovated by a local building in 1960 but was never more than a very drafty pile with a very damp basement. The old outbuildings were renovated and turned into a small workshop and a waterfront office.  The waterfront office was the gathering place for boat owners on a Sunday evening to sit and enjoy the summer air while sharing stories and the odd pint of beer from the (now closed) Railway Inn.  

In 1962 a slipway was dug and a large boatshed built to the north of the canal.  Since the 1960s the boatyard has become a thriving source of income for the village. There is also a council estate towards the south east of the village known as Great Balance (based on the road which has the most houses on it) and a development in the 1960s on Heath Lane. In 2017, the local boroug] proposed a neighbourhood plan creating 100 new homes for the overflow from Coventry and Rugby. The site is planned to be on farmland of Lutterworth Road, close to the Oxford Canal and Brinklow Arches.

Governance
Brinklow is governed by Brinklow Parish Council, which consists of six councillors. They launched a redeveloped website in 2011.

Gallery

References

Sources

 Allen, Geoff, (2000) Warwickshire Towns & Villages,

External links

Brinklow Parish Council Website

Villages in Warwickshire